Marcali is a district in north-western part of Somogy County. Marcali is also the name of the town where the district seat is found. The district is located in the Southern Transdanubia Statistical Region.

Geography 
Marcali District borders with Keszthely District (Zala County) to the north, Fonyód District and to the east, Kaposvár District to the southeast, Nagyatád District to the south, Csurgó District to the southwest, Nagykanizsa District (Zala County) to the west. The number of the inhabited places in Marcali District is 37.

Municipalities 
The district has 1 town and 36 villages.
(ordered by population, as of 1 January 2013)

The bolded municipality is city.

See also
List of cities and towns in Hungary

References

External links
 Postal codes of the Marcali District

Districts in Somogy County